Battle of Bapaume  may refer to:

Battle of Bapaume (1871), a battle of the Franco-Prussian War
First Battle of Bapaume March 1918, a battle during the German Spring Offensive of World War I
Second Battle of Bapaume August 1918, a battle during the Hundred Days' Offensive of World War I